Bipunctiphorus euctimena is a moth of the family Pterophoridae. It is found in Australia, where it is known from Brisbane, Kuranda and Toowoomba.

External links
Australian Faunal Directory

Moths of Australia
Platyptiliini
Moths described in 1913